In mathematics, calculus on finite weighted graphs is a discrete calculus for functions whose domain is the vertex set of a graph with a finite number of vertices and weights associated to the edges. This involves formulating discrete operators on graphs which are analogous to differential operators in calculus, such as graph Laplacians (or discrete Laplace operators) as discrete versions of the Laplacian, and using these operators to formulate differential equations, difference equations, or variational models on graphs which can be interpreted as discrete versions of partial differential equations or continuum variational models. Such equations and models are important tools to mathematically model, analyze, and process discrete information in many different research fields, e.g., image processing, machine learning, and network analysis. 

In applications, finite weighted graphs represent a finite number of entities by the graph's vertices, any pairwise relationships between these entities by graph edges, and the significance of a relationship by an edge weight function. Differential equations or difference equations on such graphs can be employed to leverage the graph's structure for tasks such as image segmentation (where the vertices represent pixels and the weighted edges encode pixel similarity based on comparisons of Moore neighborhoods or larger windows), data clustering, data classification, or community detection in a social network (where the vertices represent users of the network, the edges represent links between users, and the weight function indicates the strength of interactions between users).

The main advantage of finite weighted graphs is that by not being restricted to highly regular structures such as discrete regular grids, lattice graphs, or meshes, they can be applied to represent abstract data with irregular interrelationships.

If a finite weighted graph is geometrically embedded in a Euclidean space, i.e., the graph vertices represent points of this space, then it can be interpreted as a discrete approximation of a related nonlocal operator in the continuum setting.

Basic definitions 
A finite weighted graph  is defined as a triple  for which
 , is a finite set of indices denoted as graph vertices or nodes,
  is a finite set of (directed) graph edges connecting a subset of vertices,
  is an edge weight function defined on the edges of the graph.

In a directed graph, each edge  has a start node  and an end node . In an undirected graph for every edge  there exists an edge  and the weight function is required to be symmetric, i.e., . On the remainder of this page, the graphs will be assumed to be undirected, unless specifically stated otherwise. Many of the ideas presented on this page can be generalized to directed graphs.

The edge weight function  associates to every edge  a real value . For both mathematical and application specific reasons, the weight function on the edges is often required to be strictly positive and on this page it will be assumed to be so unless specifically stated otherwise. Generalizations of many of the ideas presented on this page to include negatively weighted edges are possible.

In applications each graph vertex  usually represents a single entity in the given data, e.g., elements of a finite data set, pixels in an image, or users in a social network.  A graph edge  represents a relationship between two entities, e.g. pairwise interactions or similarity based on comparisons of geometric neighborhoods (for example of pixels in images) or of another feature, with the edge weight encoding the strength of this relationship. Most commonly used weight functions are normalized to map to values between 0 and 1, i.e., .

In the following it is assumed that the considered graphs are connected without self-loops or multiple edges between vertices.

Neighborhood 
A node  is a neighbor of the node  if there exists an edge . 
Otherwise, if  is not a neighbor of  one writes .
The neighborhood  of a vertex  is simply the set of neighbors .
The degree of a vertex  is the weighted size of its neighborhood: 

 

Space of real vertex functions 
Let  be the space of (real) vertex functions.  
Since  is a finite set, any vertex function  can be represented as a -dimensional vector  (where ) and hence the space of vertex functions  can be identified with an -dimensional Hilbert space: .

 

 

The -norm is induced by the inner product.

In applications vertex functions are useful to label the vertices of the nodes. For example, in graph-based data clustering, each node represents a data point and a vertex function is used to identify cluster membership of the nodes.

Space of real edge functions 
Analogously to real vertex functions, one can introduce the space of real edge functions . As any edge function  is defined on a finite set of edges , it can be represented as a -dimensional vector , where . Hence, the space of edge functions  can be identified as a -dimensional Hilbert space, i.e., .

One special case of an edge function is the normalized edge weight function  introduced above in the section on basic definitions.

 

 

The -norm is induced by the inner product.

If one extends the edge set  in a way such that  than it becomes clear that  because . This means that each edge function can be identified with a linear matrix operator.

Differential graph operators  
An important ingredient in the calculus on finite weighted graphs is the mimicking of standard differential operators from the continuum setting in the discrete setting of finite weighted graphs.
This allows one to translate well-studied tools from mathematics, such as partial differential equations and variational methods, and make them usable in applications which can best be modeled by a graph.
The fundamental concept which makes this translation possible is the graph gradient, a first-order difference operator on graphs. Based on this one can derive higher-order difference operators, e.g., the graph Laplacian.

First-order differential operators

Weighted differences 
Let  be a finite weighted graph and let  be a vertex function. 
Then the weighted difference (or weighted graph derivative) of  along a directed edge  is

 

For any weighted difference the following properties hold:

Weighted gradient 
Based on the notion of weighted differences one defines the weighted gradient operator on graphs  as

 

This is a linear operator.

Weighted divergence 
The adjoint operator  of the weighted gradient operator is a linear operator defined by 

 

For undirected graphs with a symmetric weight function  the adjoint operator  of a function  at a vertex  has the following form:

 

The divergence on a graph measures the net outflow of an edge function in each vertex of the graph.

Second-order differential operators

Graph Laplace operator 
The weighted graph Laplacian  is a well-studied operator in the graph setting. Mimicking the relationship  of the Laplace operator in the continuum setting, the weighted graph Laplacian can be derived for any vertex  as:

 

Note that one has to assume that the graph  is undirected and has a symmetric weight function  for this representation.

Graph p-Laplace operators 
The continuous -Laplace operator is a second-order differential operator that can be well-translated to finite weighted graphs. 
It allows the translation of various partial differential equations, e.g., the heat equation, to the graph setting.

 

The necessary optimality conditions for a minimizer of the energy functional  lead to the following definition of the graph -Laplacian:

 

Applications 
Calculus on finite weighted graphs is used in a wide range of applications from different fields such as image processing, machine learning, and network analysis.
A non-exhaustive list of tasks in which finite weighted graphs have been employed is:
 image denoising
 image segmentation
 image inpainting
 tomographic reconstruction
 inverse problems
 data clustering
 point cloud compression
 hand-written digit recognition

See also
Phase field models on graphs

Notes 

References 

Calculus
Graph theory